João Souza was the defending champion but chose not to defend his title.

Roberto Carballés Baena won the title after defeating Gerald Melzer 6–1, 6–0 in the final.

Seeds

Draw

Finals

Top half

Bottom half

References
Main Draw
Qualifying Draw

International Tennis Tournament of Cortina - Singles
2017 Singles